Latin Impressions is an album by American jazz guitarist Charlie Byrd featuring tracks recorded in 1962 and  released on the Riverside label.

Reception

In its October 11, 1962 issue, DownBeat magazine gave the album 4.5 stars. AllMusic awarded the album 3 stars.

Track listing
All compositions by Charlie Byrd except as indicated
 "The Duck (O Pato)" (Jayme Silva, Neuza Teixeira) - 5:30   
 "Amor Flamenco" (Laurindo Almeida) -  2:04   
 "Azul Tiple" - 3:32   
 "Canción di Argentina" (Traditional) - 2:02   
 "Carnaval (Theme from Black Orpheus)" (Luiz Bonfá, Maria Toledo, Antônio Maria) - 2:34   
 "Homage à Villa Lobos" - 3:14   
 "Bogotá" (Ricardo Romero) - 3:48   
 "Mexican Song No. 2" (Manuel Ponce) - 2:46   
 "Mexican Song No. 1"(Ponce) - 0:56   
 "Samba de uma Nota Só" (Antonio Carlos Jobim, Newton Mendonça) - 2:54   
 "Galopera (Acuaiero Asuncena)" (Mauricio Cardozo Ocampo) - 2:11   
 "Vals" (Agustín Barrios) - 5:32

Personnel 
Charlie Byrd - guitar, tiple
Gene Byrd - guitar, bass
Keter Betts - bass 
Bill Reichenbach - drums

References 

1962 albums
Charlie Byrd albums
Riverside Records albums